Cassandra Cardinell (born April 12, 1982) is an American diver. She competed at the 2004 Summer Olympics in Athens, in the women's synchronized 10 metre platform. Cardinell was born in Loudonville, New York.

References

1982 births
Living people
American female divers
People from Loudonville, New York
Olympic divers of the United States
Divers at the 2004 Summer Olympics
Pan American Games medalists in diving
Pan American Games bronze medalists for the United States
Divers at the 2003 Pan American Games
Universiade medalists in diving
Universiade silver medalists for the United States
Universiade bronze medalists for the United States
Medalists at the 2003 Summer Universiade
Medalists at the 2005 Summer Universiade
Medalists at the 2003 Pan American Games
21st-century American women